Streptomyces scabichelini is a bacterium species from the genus of Streptomyces which has been isolated from soil from Hacıbektaş.

See also 
 List of Streptomyces species

References 

boncukensis
Bacteria described in 2021